The men's 800 metres at the 1998 European Athletics Championships was held at the Népstadion on 21, 22 and 23 August.

Medalists

Results

Round 1
Qualification: First 2 in each heat (Q) and the next 6 fastest (q) advance to the Semifinals.

Semifinals
Qualification: First 3 in each heat (Q) and the next 2 fastest (q)  advance to the Final.

Final

References

Results
Results
Results

800
800 metres at the European Athletics Championships